"Sometime Around Midnight" is a song by American indie rock band The Airborne Toxic Event. It was released as the second single from their self-titled debut album (2008) on February 2, 2009, in the UK. The song peaked at number 115 on the Billboard Hot 100, number 29 on the Wallonia Ultratop chart in Belgium, and number 33 on the UK Singles Chart.

Composition
The song is about a night when lead singer Mikel Jollett met a former girlfriend while out at a bar, during which he discovered that he still loved her. The entire band was present during this event. The lyrics to the song were written in isolation by Jollett over the course of the next three days.

Release
"Sometime Around Midnight" was iTunes' #1 alternative song of 2008. An acoustic version of this song was chosen as the Starbucks Pick of the Week for May 6.

Music video
The song has two music videos, the first of which was released in August 2008, and was directed by Jason Wishnow. This video is a literal re-telling of the song's events. The second video was released on April 30, 2009, and was directed by D.J. Caruso. The newer video is a more abstract, surreal depiction of Jollett writing the song. Actress Anita Briem stars as the love interest in the video.

Track listing
 Majordomo — 826663-11310 (UK CD single)

Charts and certifications

Weekly charts

Year-end charts

Certifications

References

2008 songs
2009 singles
The Airborne Toxic Event songs